This article shows the rosters of all participating teams at the 2002 FIVB Volleyball Women's World Championship in Germany.

Pool A













Pool B













Pool C













Pool D













References

External links
Teams at the official website
Teams at the FIVB-Homepage 

S
FIVB Volleyball Women's World Championship squads